The Tibet Mirror was a Tibetan-language newspaper published in Kalimpong, India, from 1925 to 1963 and circulated primarily in Tibet but eventually with subscribers worldwide. Its originator was Gergan Tharchin who was at the same time its journalist, editor, and manager.

History

Creation (1925)
In 1925, The Tibet Mirror (Melong) was founded at Kalimpong in West Bengal. After The Ladakh Journal (Ladakh Kyi Akbar), it is the second Tibetan language newspaper to have been started. Its founder was one Gergan Dorje Tharchin, a Tibetan of Christian denomination who was a pastor at Kalimpong, at the time a border town that acted as a centre for the wool trade between Tibet and India. He was born in 1890 in the village of Poo (Wylie: spu) in Himachal Pradesh, he had been educated by Moravian missionaries. Nevertheless, there was no article attempting to proselytise in the newspaper.

Periodicity and circulation
Published on a monthly basis, the journal first came out in October 1925 under the title Yulchog Sosoi Sargyur Melong (Mirror of News from All Sides of the World) ). All 50 copies that were printed were sent to Gergan Tharchin's friends in Lhasa, including one for the 13th Dalai Lama who sent a letter encouraging him to continue with the publication and became an ardent reader. (The 14th Dalai Lama was to inherit the subscription.)

Gergan Tharchin
Tharchin was at the same time journalist, chief editor and publisher. He would select the news from the newspapers of which he was a subscriber, and translate them into Tibetan for the journal. He had assigned to himself the goals of awakening Tibetans to the modern world and opening up Tibet to the outside world. The journal reported on what went on in the world (the Chinese Revolution, the Second World War, the independence of India, etc.) but also and above all in India, Tibet and Kalimpong itself

Influence
Despite its minuscule circulation, the journal exerted a huge influence on a small circle of Tibetan aristocrats, as well as on a smaller circle of reformists. As the journal was an advocate of Tibet's independence, Tharchin's place became a meeting place for Tibetan nationalists and reformists anxious to modernise their country facing China's imminent return.

Tharchin was in close touch with the British intelligence agents operating out of Kalimpong, a town that was a nest of political intrigue involving spies from India and China, refugees from Tibet, China, India and Burma, plus Buddhist scholars, monks, and lamas. He was acquainted with Hisao Kimura, a Japanese secret agent who had visited Mongolia on an undercover mission for the Japanese government, then travelled across Tibet to gather intelligence for the United Kingdom

In the 1950s, the Chinese Communists attempted to woo Tharchin through a Tibetan aristocrat who requested him not to publish anymore "anti-Chinese" article, and to concentrate instead on the "progress" made by China in Tibet, against the promise of a Chinese order of 500 copies of the newspaper, and the assurance not to go bankrupt. Tharchin refused.

Demise (1963)
The Tibet Mirror ceased publication in 1963 after the exiled Tibetans brought out their first newspaper – Tibetan Freedom – started by Gyalo Thondup from Darjeeling Besides, Tharchin was too old to continue publication. He died in 1976 

In 2005, the small house where The Tibet Mirror was based is still standing on the Giri road, with a sign board reading "The Tibet Mirror Press, Kalimpong, Estd. 1925" in English, Tibetan and Hindi

References

Further reading
 Paul G. Hackett, Kalimpong, Gergan Dorje Tharchin, and his Mirror newspaper, Columbia University, retrieved 24 March 2021.
Tashi Tsering, The Life of Rev. G. Tharchin: Missionary and Pioneer, Amnye Machen Institute, Dharamsala, 1998
H. (Herbert) Louis Fader, Called from Obscurity: The Life and Times of a True Son of Tibet - Gergan Dorje Tharchin, Tibet Mirror Press, Kalimpong, Vol. 1, 2002 ; Vol. 2, 2004 ; Himalayan Ecosphere Publisher, Vol. 3, 2009 (Long Title: Called from Obscurity: The Life and Times of a True Son of Tibet, God's Humble Servant from Poo, Gergan Dorje Tharchin, with Particular Attention Given to His Good Friend and Illustrious Co-Laborer in the Gospel Sadhu Sundar Singh of India, with a foreword by His Holiness Dalai Lama XIV of Tibet and an introduction by Dawa Norbu)

External links 
  Digitized access to 224 issues of the Tibet Mirror, archival holdings published between the years 1927–1963, through Columbia University Libraries, including collections at the Beinecke Rare Book & Manuscript Library at Yale University.
 Digitized access to seventy-one issues of the Tibet Mirror, published between the years 1927–1963, through the Beinecke Rare Book & Manuscript Library at Yale University.

Kalimpong
Newspapers published in India
Tibetan-language newspapers
Tibetan independence movement
Publications established in 1925
Indigenous rights publications
1925 establishments in India
1963 disestablishments in India
Publications disestablished in 1963